Stealing Harvard is a 2002 American slapstick action comedy film directed by Bruce McCulloch and written by Martin Hynes and Peter Tolan, about a man who resorts to crime to pay for his niece's Harvard tuition. The film stars Jason Lee and Tom Green with Leslie Mann, Dennis Farina, Richard Jenkins, John C. McGinley, Tammy Blanchard, and Megan Mullally. It was released on September 13, 2002 by Sony Pictures Releasing under their Columbia Pictures label.

Plot
John Plummer is engaged to Elaine Warner and intends to use his life savings of $30,000 to put a down payment on a house. He works for Elaine's father, Mr. Warner, who dislikes John. Simultaneously, John's niece Noreen, daughter of sister Patty, is accepted to Harvard University, but needs an additional $30,000 on top of her grants and scholarships. Noreen shows John an old videotape where he promised to pay for Noreen's college. John now has a moral and financial dilemma – disappoint his fiancée or disappoint his niece and ruin her chance at escaping poverty.

John confides in his friend Walter "Duff" Duffy, a landscaper. He convinces John to steal from one of his rich clients, who keeps large amounts of cash in an unlocked safe. The pair set off to steal the cash, but Duff runs away when lights come on in the home, leaving John to get caught by Emmett Cook. At gunpoint, Cook forces John to cross-dress and role-play the part of Cook's late wife as the two men lie in bed and "spoon". Eventually, after taking an incriminating photograph of John, Cook releases him. As he is leaving, Mr. Warner rides by and takes note of John's panicked behavior, believing that he has caught John in an affair.

Further capers ensue as John and Duff try to rob a liquor store and later attempt to con a drug lord out of $30,000 by concocting a phony story about running an ecstasy ring. A police detective is on to John and Duff, but never has enough evidence to actually pin any of the crimes on them. Meanwhile, Mr. Warner breaks into Cook's residence in order to get evidence against John, and once Cook catches him, he is forced to "spoon" as well. Despite this, Warner finds a common ground with Cook as he is also widower though he doesn’t agree with Cook’s method of coping. Before leaving, Warner finds the photo of John from the album, which he then gives to Elaine.

John is forced to confess everything to Elaine, who is not upset and admires the lengths he was willing to go to in order to please her and send his niece to Harvard. Elaine then confides in John that her father keeps a great deal of money at his business, and that it would be easy for them to steal it. John, Elaine, and Duff set out to rob the business in the night. Unfortunately, Mr. Warner had hid his dog Rex inside the vault. Rex latches on to Duff’s crotch, and oddly, enjoys it so much that he doesn’t let go. Just as John and Elaine find the money, Mr. Warner tries to attack them but he is caught by the detective who mistakes him for a burglar. While Duff is relentlessly pursued by Rex, John and Elaine escape to Duff's van. The police arrive and the gang unsuccessfully tries to get away. They are all taken into custody by the detective and facing a series of charges. John feels doomed, until the judge in charge of his arraignment turns out to be the gun-toting Emmett Cook.

Upon their mutual recognition, John flashes a written message to Cook, threatening to expose the judge's fetish; upon reading the note, Cook quickly dismisses all charges against John. Finally, Duff comes through as best he can and gives John his life savings, $1,000, which John bets on a long-shot horse which wins and which paid 30 to 1. John and Elaine are married, Noreen goes off to college, and, in the final scene, John is left to ponder how Duff could possibly accumulate $1,000. The last scene shows Duff offering to "spoon" with Cook for $1,000.

Cast
 Jason Lee as John Plummer
 Tom Green as Walter "Duff" Duffy
 Leslie Mann as Elaine Warner
 Dennis Farina as Mr. Warner
 Richard Jenkins as Honorable Judge Emmett Cook (credited as Mr. Cook)
 John C. McGinley as Detective Charles
 Tammy Blanchard as Noreen Plummer
 Megan Mullally as Patty Plummer
 Zeus as Rex the Dog
 Chris Penn as David Loach
 Seymour Cassel as Uncle Jack
 Ken Magee as Butcher
 Martin Starr as Liquor Store Kid
 Mary Gillis as Duff's mother
 Bruce McCulloch as Fidio the Lawyer

Reception
Stealing Harvard received negative reviews from critics. It currently holds a 9% rating on Rotten Tomatoes based on 103 reviews with the consensus: "There are some laughs in Stealing Harvard, but they are few and far between, and Tom Green's antics grow old fast."

Box office
Released September 13, 2002 the film grossed US$14,036,406 at the U.S. box office.

Accolades
Tom Green was nominated for Worst Supporting Actor in the 2002 Golden Raspberry Awards. He also won Worst Actor at the 2002 Stinkers Bad Movie Awards.

References

External links
 
 
 
 

2000s buddy comedy films
2000s crime comedy films
American buddy comedy films
American crime comedy films
Imagine Entertainment films
Revolution Studios films
Columbia Pictures films
2000s English-language films
Films scored by Christophe Beck
Films directed by Bruce McCulloch
Films set in Harvard University
Films set in Massachusetts
Films with screenplays by Peter Tolan
2002 comedy films
2002 films
2000s American films